Rishab Chadha is an Indian actor who often appears in Hindi films, shows on Indian television and web series. He is best known his roles in Drishyam, Khoobsurat, Lupt and Aadat Se Majboor.

Early life and education 
Rishab Chadha was born on 20 June 1994 in Mumbai, Maharashtra. He completed his schooling from Gopal Sharma Memorial School and graduated from R. D. National College, Bandra with a degree in BMM.

Acting career 
Rishab Chadha started his acting career at a very young age with Zee TV serial Aladdin in 2007 and there was no looking back for him. He gained popularity as a teenage artist in television and appeared in many children shows. He was a part of Disney's Best of Luck Nikki (2011) and The Suite Life of Karan & Kabir (2012). He has also acted in the series Khauff Begins... Ringa Ringa Roses (2013) on Life OK and in Kota Toppers (2015–16) on UTV Bindass. He was last seen on television in SAB TV show 
Aadat Se Majboor (2017).
Besides working in television, Rishab Chadha regularly appears in web series. He started his web series career in 2016 with Shaadi Boys on Voot. He has recently worked in Boys with Toys (2019) for Hungama App and Bhootpurva (2019) on ZEE5.
Rishab Chadha has made his Bollywood debut in 2014 with Khoobsurat. He was seen in 2015 release Drishyam. 
After making his acting debut at the age of 13 Rishab Chadha went on work in many television commercials. He has appeared in more than 150 commercials in his twelve years long career. Some of his notable commercials are Sprite, eBay.in, Dell, KFC, ViseAC, IDEA, KOPIKO, Lotte Choco Pie, Kala Hit, Kingfisher Radler etc.
Apart from working in small and big screen Rishab Chadha has acted in commercial theater for three years with Out of the Box production. The Gone Case, Frying Pan and 786 are some of his notable theatrical works.

Filmography

Films

Television

Web series

References

External links 

 https://www.imdb.com/name/nm6226780/

Living people
Indian male film actors
Male actors in Hindi cinema
1994 births